Robert Willoughby Corrigan (23 September 1927 – 1 September 1993) was an American academic and the founding editor of the Carleton Drama Review, which later became TDR: The Drama Review.

Robert Willoughby Corrigan was born in Portage, Wisconsin, on 23 September 1927. His father was Episcopal bishop Daniel Corrigan. The younger Corrigan earned a bachelor's degree at Cornell University in 1950, followed by a master's degree from Johns Hopkins University two years later. In 1955, Corrigan completed a doctorate in comparative literature from the University of Minnesota. He founded the Carleton Drama Review later that year shortly after joining the faculty of Carleton College. When Corrigan began teaching at Tulane University in 1957, the academic journal went with him and was renamed the Tulane Drama Review. Richard Schechner became chief editor of the journal when Corrigan took a position at Carnegie Mellon University in 1962. Corrigan was the inaugural dean of the New York University School of the Arts, established in 1965. In 1970, he was named the president of the California Institute of the Arts, three years after he began teaching there. Corrigan resigned from CalArts in May 1972, and later taught at the University of Michigan, as well as the University of Wisconsin–Milwaukee, where he served as dean of the School of Fine Arts. Corrigan assumed the deanship at the School of Arts and Humanities at the University of Texas at Dallas in 1984, where he remained until his August 1992 resignation. He died in Dallas on 1 September 1993, of Shy–Drager syndrome.

References

1927 births
1993 deaths
Tisch School of the Arts faculty
California Institute of the Arts faculty
Cornell University alumni
Johns Hopkins University alumni
University of Michigan faculty
University of Minnesota College of Liberal Arts alumni
Carleton College faculty
People from Portage, Wisconsin
American theatre people
Academic journal editors
American university and college faculty deans
Carnegie Mellon University faculty
University of Wisconsin–Milwaukee faculty
University of Texas at Dallas faculty
Tulane University faculty
Deaths from multiple system atrophy
Neurological disease deaths in Texas